Rudolf Heinrich Friedrich Weinland (22 November 1865, in Hohenwittlingen – 9 August 1936, in Münster) was a German pharmaceutical chemist. He was the son of zoologist David Friedrich Weinland (1829–1915).

From 1887 he studied at the Polytechnic in Stuttgart and at the University of Erlangen, receiving his doctorate from the latter institution in 1891. From 1892 he worked as an assistant to Albert Hilger in the chemistry laboratory at the University of Munich, where in 1899 he obtained his habilitation for pharmaceutical chemistry. In 1902 he was named an associate professor at the University of Tübingen, then in 1920 relocated to Würzburg as head of the department of pharmaceutical chemistry and the laboratory of applied chemistry.

Selected works 
 Über die Einwirkung der Oxyde, Hydroxyde von Beryllium, Magnesium, Zink, Cadmium und Quecksilber auf Metallsalze verschiedener Zusammensetzung, 1892 – On the action of oxides, hydroxides of beryllium, magnesium, zinc, cadmium and mercury in metal salts of different composition.
 Anleitung für das Praktikum in der Gewichtsanalyse, 1913.
 Darstellung anorganischer Präparate zur Einführung in die präparative anorganische Chemie, (with Christian Beck, 1913) – Representative inorganic preparations as an introduction to preparative inorganic chemistry.
 Einführung in die Chemie der Komplex-Verbindungen (Wernersche Koordinationslehre) in elementarer Darstellung (2nd edition, 1924) – Introduction to the chemistry of complex compounds (Werner's coordination chemistry) in elementary representation.

References 

1865 births
1936 deaths
People from Bad Urach
University of Erlangen-Nuremberg alumni
University of Stuttgart alumni
Academic staff of the University of Tübingen
Academic staff of the University of Würzburg
20th-century German chemists
19th-century German chemists